Acromyrmex disciger is a species of leaf-cutter ant, a New World ant of the subfamily Myrmicinae of the genus Acromyrmex. This species is from one of the two genera of advanced attines (fungus-growing ants) within the tribe Attini.  It is found in the wild naturally in Paraguay.

See also
List of leafcutter ants

References

Acromyrmex
Insects described in 1887
Hymenoptera of South America